Igra (Egra) is a rural locality (a settlement) and the administrative center of Igrinsky District of the Udmurt Republic, Russia, located  north of Izhevsk at the European route E22, which changes there from M7 to the main Siberian route P242. Population:

Gallery

References

Rural localities in Udmurtia
Glazovsky Uyezd